Spectroscopy Letters is a peer-reviewed scientific journal for rapid communications about work on a wide variety of spectroscopic methods covering all aspects of  spectroscopy.

Abstracting and indexing 
The journal is abstracted and indexed by the Science Citation Index and Current Contents/Physical, Chemical & Earth Sciences.

External links 
 

Chemistry journals
Optics journals
Taylor & Francis academic journals
Publications established in 1968
English-language journals